Eubranchus capellinii is a species of sea slug or nudibranch, a marine gastropod mollusc in the family Eubranchidae. It has been suggested that it is the same species as Eubranchus doriae and that this name should take precedence.

Distribution
This species was described from Genova, Italy.

References

Eubranchidae
Gastropods described in 1879